Brus Laguna is a municipality in the Honduran department of Gracias a Dios.

The municipality's population is about 13,200 inhabitants.

Demographics
At the time of the 2013 Honduras census, Brus Laguna municipality had a population of 12,720. Of these, 78.63% were Indigenous (77.64% Miskito), 20.25% Mestizo, 0.52% White, 0.45% Afro-Honduran or Black and 0.16% others.

References

Municipalities of the Gracias a Dios Department
Road-inaccessible communities of North America